Emil G. Michael (born September 19, 1972) is an Egyptian-born American businessman. Michael was the Senior Vice President of Business and Chief Business Officer at Uber, and the Chief Operating Officer of Klout.

Early life and education
Born in Cairo, Egypt, Michael is a Coptic Christian who moved to the United States with his family in the early 1970s.  Michael received his B.A. in Government cum laude from Harvard University, where he wrote for the Harvard Crimson and served as president of the Harvard Republican Club. During his presidency, the club changed its name to the Harvard-Radcliffe Republican Club in an effort to reach out to potential female members. He received his J.D. degree with honors from Stanford Law School.

Career

Gemini Consulting
Michael started his career as a strategy consultant at Gemini Consulting's Converging Markets Laboratory in Cambridge, Massachusetts.

Goldman Sachs
After law school, Michael served as an Associate in the Communications, Media and Entertainment Investment Banking Group at Goldman Sachs in New York. He also worked on merger and hostile takeover advisory projects and equity and bank debt financing. He left Goldman Sachs in 1999.

Tellme Networks
Michael was an executive at internet-telephony startup Tellme Networks for nine years, from June 1999 until 2008. Tellme was a forerunner of speech recognition technology. The company was sold to Microsoft for approximately $800 million in 2007.

Department of Defense
Michael was selected as one of 15 White House Fellows during the first year of the Obama administration, where he served as a Special Assistant to U.S. Defense Secretary Robert Gates from 2009 until 2011. Michael has stated that he spent time on assignment in Afghanistan, Pakistan, and other destinations.

Tech consultant
After his tenure at the Pentagon, Michael acted as a consultant to technology companies in New York.

Klout
In July 2012, he became Chief Operating Officer and a member of the Board of Directors of Klout. He held the COO title until September 2013 when he left to join Uber. Klout was sold to Lithium for approximately $200 million in early 2014.

Uber
Michael joined Uber as Senior Vice President of Business in September 2013. He acted as CEO Travis Kalanick's right-hand-man, helping the company raise nearly $15 billion from key investors worldwide. By February 2018, Uber became the world's most valued private technology company and had raised the most money of any private start-up in history.

China
Michael was a key player in the development of Uber's ride-sharing efforts in China, taking an investment of $2 billion to a value of $7 billion in 2016. He also worked on creating new partnerships with Chinese companies such as Baidu. Michael led the merger of Uber's China operations with that of the local competitor Didi Chuxing in August 2016. In June 2021, Didi raised $4.4 billion in its IPO.

Russia
In 2017, Michael helped negotiate a deal with Yandex, the largest technology firm and most popular internet search engine in Russia, known as the "Google of Russia," in which Uber owned 36.6 percent of a joint ride-sharing entity in Russia. Uber invested $225 million, and Yandex invested $100 million.

Checkstop 
In June 2021, Michael was one of several investors that led the funding of Checkstop, AI-based software designed to help moderate content on platforms such as YouTube and Facebook.

Vetted for cabinet post
In August 2019, it was revealed that the Trump administration considered Michael for the job of Secretary of Transportation at the time that Trump was forming his government, in early 2016. The job ended up going to Elaine Chao.

SPAC IPO 
Michael, Chairman and CEO of DPCM Capital planned to file for an initial public offering of $250 million for a blank check company. Eric Schmidt is a special advisor to DPCM.

Journalism controversy
While at Uber, Michael became embroiled in a controversy over the company's relationship with journalists. On November 17, 2014, BuzzFeed editor-in-chief Ben Smith reported that Uber senior executive Emil Michael "outlined the notion of spending 'a million dollars'" to hire four top opposition researchers and four journalists. He said that team could help Uber fight back against the press by looking into "personal lives, your families". Michael believed his disclosure was "off the record," Michael claimed merely to have asked why journalists can write what he thought were false stories and attack pieces about business people. Michael claims to have suggested that Uber hire a team of opposition researchers and journalists, give them a million-dollar budget, and have the team attack journalists who wrote negative stories about Uber. He specifically targeted Sarah Lacy, a journalist who worked for Pando Daily and had criticized the misogynist practices and culture of Uber.   Sarah accused Uber of “sexism and misogyny" specifically of Uber's Chief Executive Officer, Travis Kalanick. Travis later made a series of apologetic tweets claiming Emil Michael's comments did not represent the company's views. The controversy made national news and stirred criticism against Uber. Michael later apologized for his words.

Karaoke bar controversy
In 2014, several local Uber employees in Seoul, South Korea, invited Michael with them to visit a "hostess escort-karaoke bar" during a business trip. Four of the other men in the group picked hostesses out of a lineup, and then went to the bar to sing Karaoke. One of the female Uber managers in the group felt uncomfortable during this encounter and reported the event to HR at Uber about one year later. Although the issue had already been resolved, the story came out in March 2017 when Michael contacted Gabi Holzwarth, CEO Kalanick's ex-girlfriend, who had also been in the group at the Karaoke bar, to warn her about an upcoming article in the press. Holzwarth claims that Michael asked her to keep the visit to the hostess bar quiet, among other accusations, in the year after her relationship with Mr. Kalanick ended in 2016. Michael has expressed remorse and apologized for "attending and failing to prevent" the visit to the bar. Three months after the March article, Michael left his position at Uber after four years at the company.

Non-profit board memberships
In 2014, Michael, and eight others, were appointed to the Pentagon's Defense Business Board. The eight joined 15 members already sitting on the board, which was created in 2002 to provide independent advice on the private sector. Michael was the only one of the new appointees to have experience with startups.

Startups
Michael has invested and/or advised in the following startups:

 Cepi Style
 Flipboard
 Joymode
 NeuCoin
 Fundbox
 Rise
 Kidizen
 Familiar
 Swipely
 Ribbon

Recognition
Michael was named one of the “Most Creative People in Marketing" and one of the “100 Most Creative People in Business” in 2014 by Fast Company.

Personal life
Michael married his longtime girlfriend, Julie Herrin, in a ceremony in Miami, Florida, in early 2018. The couple met in 2012 in Las Vegas, NV.

References

External links
 

American business executives
American people of Coptic descent
Living people
Stanford Law School alumni
Harvard University alumni
1972 births